Archbold Gymnasium is a gymnasium located on the campus of Syracuse University in Syracuse, New York.

History
It was built in 1908 with money donated by John Dustin Archbold, a major benefactor of the university, who also funded the building of Archbold Stadium, just to the west of the gymnasium (now the site of the Carrier Dome). It was the largest college gymnasium when built.

It served as the home to the men's basketball team until the building of the Manley Field House in 1962, with the exception of the time from January, 1947 to 1949.  This was due to a large fire which gutted most of the building.  The building was rebuilt from 1948 to 1949, and a southern addition was made in 1952, as well as a neighboring gymnasium (Flanagan Gymnasium), which was built in 1989 and was only accessible via a glass skyway from Archbold Gymnasium.

Current use
The gymnasium once housed the club gymnastics team and served as the student health, wellness and recreation complex. The facility became a combined student health, wellness and Recreation complex called the Barnes Center at The Arch after major renovation in 2019. 

The building now houses the school's main recreation facility including climbing wall, esports room, basketball courts, a swimming pool, and fitness studios.
The counseling center, health services, health promotions, pharmacy, and medical records offices are all housed in the new Barnes Center at The Arch. It is also home to the university’s men's and women's indoor rowing facilities.

See also
Bowne Hall
Comstock Tract Buildings
Steele Hall

References

External links

Sports venues in Syracuse, New York
Defunct college basketball venues in the United States
Syracuse Orange basketball venues
Gymnastics venues in New York (state)
University and college student recreation centers in the United States
1908 establishments in New York (state)
Sports venues completed in 1908
Archbold Gymnasium